Arakel Davrizhetsi or Arakel of Tabriz (1590s–1670) was a 17th-century Armenian historian and clergyman from Tabriz. His History is an important and reliable source for the histories of the Safavid and Ottoman empires, Armenia, Azerbaijan, and Georgia for the period 1602–1662.

Background 
Arakel was born in Tabriz (Davrēzh in Armenian) in the 1590s. He received his theological training at the seminary at Echmiadzin, the seat of the Armenian Apostolic Church, where he was ordained a vardapet (celibate priest/archimandrite). In 1636 he was appointed abbot of the monastery of Hovhannavank Monastery․ He was later sent on various mission to Isfahan, Urfa, Aleppo, Jerusalem, and Athens as a nuncio of Catholicos Pilippos.

Within his life he was already called "the Historian Arakel" and had a reputation of being a very competent and inquisitive person. In 1662, he completed his History, also known as the Book of Histories (Girkʻ Patmuteantsʻ), a unique work on the history of Armenia and adjacent countries and peoples in the seventeenth century. He witnessed many events and described them in the book. Notably, his work contains an account of the mass deportation of Armenians under the Safavid shah Abbas. Arakel’s work is  Arakel Davrizhetsi was the first Armenian historian whose work was printed. In 1669, Arakel's Book of Histories was published in Amsterdam. Arakel Davrizhetsi died in 1670 at Echmiadzin and was buried, as he desired, in the cemetery of Echmiadzin's Gayane monastery.

References

Sources
 
 Aṛakʻel Davrizhetsi, Patmutʻyun, 1988, Yerevan: Sovetakan Grogh.

Writers from Tabriz
Persian Armenians
Ethnic Armenian historians
Safavid historians
1590s births
1670 deaths
17th-century Iranian historians
17th-century Armenian writers
17th-century writers of Safavid Iran